Timson may refer to:

Andrew Timson (born 1961), English rugby league footballer of the 1970s and 1980s
Frank Timson (1909-1960), Australian politician
Matt Timson, British comic book artist

See also 
Timsons, a British manufacturing company
Timpson (disambiguation)

Patronymic surnames